The FIFA Two refers to Colin Healy and Gareth Farrelly, two Irish international football players who were prevented from playing for Cork City as they had already played for two other clubs in the 2006-07 period. After lobbying from Ireland's football governing body, the Football Association of Ireland, FIFA ultimately changed its transfer regulations in January 2008.

The problem 
On 2 April 2007, FIFA informed Cork City that they would not allow two players, Irish internationals Colin Healy and Gareth Farrelly, to play for the club. FIFA ruled that the players had already played for two other clubs in the previous 12 months, and so decreed that neither player could play until July 2007. Cork City had signed contracts with these two players, and so the options open to them were either to keep paying the players even though they cannot play, or cancel the contracts.

The players
Both Colin Healy and Gareth Farrelly have represented the Republic of Ireland at senior international level. 

Gareth Farrelly has played at the highest level in England, in the Premier League, with Aston Villa, Everton and Bolton Wanderers. Farrelly joined Bohemians in late August 2004 as player-manager, and left the position on 30 August 2006. He subsequently joined English side Blackpool on a short-term contract, which expired in February 2007.

Colin Healy has played with Celtic and Sunderland, where he had the extreme misfortune to break his leg on two occasions. On 10 August 2006, Healy signed a one-year contract with Barnsley. After making 10 appearances for Barnsley, he had his contract cancelled by mutual consent. During this period, he also played on loan with Bradford City.

The rule
According to the then-current FIFA Regulations for the Status and Transfer of Players, Chapter III: Registration of Players, Article 5.3 stated:

The precedent
 The Finnish Football Federation, an association that also has its season within a calendar year, just like Ireland, simply ignores this rule, because their season is "out of sync" with the FIFA designated season. Any player who signs for a Finnish club, and who is in the same situation as Colin Healy or Gareth Farrelly, is allowed to play in official matches in Finland.
 A more telling precedent is the case of Javier Mascherano. FIFA allowed Mascherano, an Argentine international, to join Liverpool, his third team in the 12-month period, from West Ham United. FIFA ruled that as the other team involved, Corinthians, is from Brazil and so competes in a January-December season, they were outside the scope of the July-June restriction.
 A number of players with other League of Ireland sides have also been caught by Article 5.3, but have since been cleared to play. One of these players is Shaun Holmes who was registered with 3 clubs Glentoran, Derry and Finn Harps. Glentoran is a Northern Irish League club, a league that follows the FIFA designated season. Shaun Holmes has played for a club in a different federation, the same situation as both Farrelly and Healy, but this fact has not proved a barrier to him playing in the League of Ireland that season.

The law
It was possible that the FIFA regulations at that time could conflict with certain provisions of European Community law, or, at the very least, an arguable case could be made that such a conflict existed.

Article 39EC states:

 Freedom of movement for workers shall be secured within the Community
 Such freedom of movement shall entail the abolition of any discrimination based on nationality between workers of the Member States as regards employment, remuneration and other conditions of work and employment
 It shall entail the right, subject to limitations justified on grounds of public policy, public security or public health:
a) to accept offers of employment actually made;
b) to move freely within the territory of Member States for this purpose;
c) to stay in a Member State for the purpose of employment in accordance with the provisions governing the employment of nationals of that State laid down by law, regulation or administrative action;
d) to remain in the territory of a Member State after having been employed in that State, subject to conditions which shall be embodied in implementing regulations to be drawn up by the Commission

Article 40 b EC states:

The Council shall, acting in accordance with the procedure referred to in Article 251 (which refers to EC procedures for the adoption of Acts) and after consulting the Economic and Social Committee, issue directives or make regulations setting out the measures required to bring about freedom of movement for workers, as defined in Article 39, in particular:
b) by abolishing those administrative procedures and practices and those qualifying periods in respect of eligibility for available employment, whether resulting from national legislation or from agreements previously concluded between Member States, the maintenance of which would form an obstacle to liberalisation of the movement of workers;

Article 43EC states: 

Within the framework of the provisions set out below, restrictions on the freedom of establishment of nationals of a Member State in the territory of another Member State shall be prohibited. Such prohibition shall also apply to restrictions on the setting-up of agencies, branches or subsidiaries by nationals of any Member State established in the territory of any Member State.

Freedom of establishment shall include the right to take up and pursue activities as self-employed persons and to set up and manage undertakings, in particular companies or firms within the meaning of the second paragraph of Article 48, under the conditions laid down for its own nationals by the law of the country where such establishment is effected, subject to the provisions of the chapter relating to capital.

There are also various Directives which govern Freedom of Movement of People.

The solution 
FIFA added the following language to Article 5.3:

References

External links 
 The FAI article about the problem
 The news report by RTE
 See article 5.3 of the FIFA document,  Regulations on the Status and Transfer of Players

2007 in Republic of Ireland association football
Association football controversies
Association football transfers
History of association football
Football Association of Ireland

it:Calciomercato
nl:Transfer